The Diamond is the sheer and prominent east face of Longs Peak and named for the shape of the cliff. It is a world-famous Alpine climb.

Climbing 
In 1954, the first proposal made to the National Park Service to climb the Diamond was met with an official closure, a stance not changed until 1960.  The Diamond was first ascended by Dave Rearick and Bob Kamps,  August 1–3, 1960, by a route that would come to be known simply as D1.  This route would later be listed in Allen Steck and Steve Roper's influential book Fifty Classic Climbs of North America.  The easiest route on the face, the Casual Route (5.10-), was first climbed in 1977 and became the most popular route up the wall.

See also

List of Colorado mountain ranges
List of Colorado mountain summits
List of Colorado fourteeners
List of Colorado 4000 meter prominent summits
List of the most prominent summits of Colorado
List of Colorado county high points

References

External links

 rockclimbing.com
 mountainproject.com
 summitpost.org

Climbing routes
Climbing areas of Colorado